Carl Bradshaw (born 2 October 1968) is an English former professional footballer who played as a right back.

He notably played in the Premier League for Sheffield United and Norwich City, having previously featured in the top flight for Sheffield Wednesday and Manchester City. He also played in the Football League with Barnsley, Wigan Athletic and Scunthorpe United, before finishing his career in non-league with Alfreton Town.

Playing career
Bradshaw's first club was Sheffield Wednesday. However, his first senior appearance came in a loan spell at Barnsley. He joined Manchester City in September 1988, in a swap with Imre Varadi. His Manchester City debut came in October 1988, as a substitute against West Bromwich Albion. He started the following match, against Sunderland, but this proved to be his only start for the club. In a year at Manchester City he made a total of seven appearances. He then transferred to Sheffield United in September 1989.

In September 1997, Bradshaw served a short prison sentence after an incident involving himself and Norwich teammate Andy Johnson that resulted in Bradshaw assaulting a taxi driver. His contract with Norwich was subsequently cancelled after being released from prison, and he signed with Wigan Athletic. Whilst at Wigan he played in the final as they won the 1998–99 Football League Trophy.

Personal life
Since retirement, Bradshaw has worked as a bricklayer.

References

External links
Career information at ex-canaries.co.uk

1968 births
Living people
Footballers from Sheffield
Sheffield Wednesday F.C. players
Barnsley F.C. players
Manchester City F.C. players
Sheffield United F.C. players
Norwich City F.C. players
Wigan Athletic F.C. players
Scunthorpe United F.C. players
Alfreton Town F.C. players
Premier League players
English footballers
Association football fullbacks